Yeh Saali Zindagi is a 2011 Hindi crime thriller film directed by Sudhir Mishra. The film stars Irrfan Khan, Chitrangada Singh, Arunoday Singh and Aditi Rao Hydari in the lead roles. The film was released on 4 February 2011 to positive reviews and was a below average grosser at the box office.

Plot
Arun is a Chartered Accountant who works for Mr. Mehta and helps him run his illegal business. Arun is in love with Priti, but she falls for Shyam, who was introduced to her by Arun.

After Badey, a gangster of Delhi falls out of favour of Minister Verma, he is sent to jail and humiliated and beaten daily on orders of the Minister. Satbir is a dishonest police officer who works for Badey and helps him in the jail. Kuldeep, who is also in jail with Badey is released and goes to his wife Shanti. Badey's brother, Chhotey and his gang of members, Kuldeep, Tony, Chacha, Guddu and others plan Badey's release by kidnapping Verma's to be son-in-law, Shyam and daughter, Anjali. Things do not go as planned and they end up kidnapping Shyam and his girlfriend Priti. To ensure Shyam's safety, Priti agrees to liaise between Verma and the gangsters, not knowing that Arun had been following them since the abduction. She meets Anjali, Verma and Shyam's father Singhania. However, Mr. Verma, who discovers Shyam's affair with Priti refuses to negotiate Badey's release. Arun, in the meantime, transfers illegal and hawala money into the bank accounts of Verma's son and threatens him with leaking this information to media if he does not ensure Badey's release. However, it comes to light that Chhotey wants to get Badey out only to get details of his bank accounts and plans to kill him. Learning of this, Badey gives the details of his foreign bank accounts to Kuldeep.

Upon being rescued from the prison, Chhotey unexpectedly comes from Georgia and meets Badey. In the meantime, police reach the spot and in the cross fire, Badey escapes from Chhotey and is helped by Kuldeep and his gang. However, he is shot in the back and later kills himself. With Badey dead and Chhotey looking for him, Kuldeep decides to leave the country and asks Shyam's father for a ransom of  15 crores. Priti, under the guise of calling Mr. Singhania, calls Arun. Arun reaches the spot and tells Priti that he transferred  170 million into her account which should be used by her to free Shyam and herself and live a happy life. Priti, now realizes that she actually loves Arun.

Priti brings the money to a port from where Kuldeep plans to escape. Chhotey also reaches there, but Satbir double crosses him and Kuldeep kills Chhotey to avenge the murder of his father. However, one of the bullets hits a railing and ricochets and hits Arun. The gangsters leave the spot and Priti confesses to Arun that she loves him.

Cast
Irrfan Khan as Arun Shukla
Chitrangada Singh as Priti Shirodkar
Vipul Gupta as Shyam Singhania
Arunoday Singh as Kuldeep Sawhney
Aditi Rao Hydari as Shanti Ghosh
Saurabh Shukla as Mehta Anand
Sushant Singh as Inspector Satbir Choudhary
Vipin Sharma as Tanveer 'Tony' Ahmed
Yashpal Sharma as Badey
Prashant Narayanan as Chhotey
Tarun Shukla as Guddu
Madhvi Singh as Anjali Verma, Minister Verma's daughter 
Nasser Abdullah as Singhania, Shyam's father
Kamal Chandra as Jija
Aditya Bhattacharya
Anil Sharma as Verma, Minister
Masood Akhtar
Manu Rishi Chaddha

Reception

Critical reception
The film received positive acclaim from critics. Nikhat Kazmi from the Times of India gave it 4.5/5 saying "Dark, devious and different, Yeh Saali Zindagi is brain-and-brawn drama".

Sukanya Verma from Rediff.com rated it 3.5/5 calling it a "A twisted entertainer" and further stated that "Yeh Saali Zindagi rocks, it's wonderfully unrestrained and entertaining with its mouthful of zingers penned by Mishra and Manu Rishi".

Rajeev Masand from IBNLive gave it 3 out of 5 stating that "Yeh Saali Zindagi surprises you, it takes its time to unfold, but it's a delicious little treat if you muster the patience for it".

Kaveree Bamzai from India Today gave it 3 out of 5 and said "It's a delightful little trifle that is individual fun, and so well acted".

Blessy Chettiar from the DNA also gave it 3 out of 5 saying that "Yeh Saali Zindagi, is chaotic but enjoyable, just like its hatke title Mishra presents a thrilling and hatke account of two men and the lengths they go to for love".

Mayank Shekhar from Hindustan Times gave the film 3 out of 5.
On the review aggregator website ReviewGang, the film has received a 6.5/10 rating. On Rotten Tomatoes website Yeh Saali Zindagi has received a 75% fresh rating.

Box office
Yeh Saali Zindagi opened well at the box office scoring 45.0 million net over its first weekend. It remained steady throughout its first week grossing 75 million net. The film saw a huge drop in its second week, due to the release of Patiala House and grossed just 3 crore net. It finished its lifetime collections at 107.5 million net. It was declared "below average" by Boxoffice-India.

Soundtrack
The music has been composed by sitarist Nishat Khan and has lyrics penned by Swanand Kirkire. The Yeh Saali Zindagi song has been composed and sung by Abhishek Ray.

References

External links

2011 films
2010s Hindi-language films
2011 romantic drama films
Films scored by Nishat Khan
Indian romantic drama films
Films scored by Abhishek Ray
Indian sequel films
Films directed by Sudhir Mishra